Antjuan Tobias Taylor is an American actor.
Antjuan has appeared in the Lifetime television series Army Wives. as PFC Guy Riggs, a young soldier who is deployed in Afghanistan.

Personal life
Born in Birmingham, Alabama, Taylor attended The University of Alabama where he studied Communications and Information Sciences. He receives a Bachelor of Arts & Sciences in May 2014 in Interdisciplinary Studies. While studying at The University, Antjuan worked as the Online Newspaper Editor for The Crimson White student-run newspaper which received a Mark of Excellence Award by the Society of Professional Journalists as well as the Mark of Excellence Award and a Gold Crown Award from the Columbia Scholastic Press Association and was inducted into the College Media Hall of Fame. He is also a member of the Eta Chi Chapter of  Kappa Alpha Psi fraternity,  where he acted as Vice Polemarch while attending The University of Alabama.

Career
Antjuan begin his career in the theatre performing in regional plays, commercials and voice over work. He won Onstage Atlanta's Post & Alley Award for Best Actor in a Lead role for his portrayal of Jefferson in Romulus Linney's "A Lesson Before Dying." He signed on as PFC Guy Riggs on ABC Lifetime (TV network)'s Army Wives in 2010. His character's arch spanned over the show's top rated seasons and episodes making ABC Lifetime TV's history books. He has also appeared on the BET Network's first scripted television show Somebodies, as well as the Tyler Perry TBS sitcom, Meet The Browns.

References

External links
"Entertainment Weekly"  Retrieved 2011-28-3
"The New York Times Movies & TV"  Retrieved 2010-22-12
"Theatre Review Online"  Retrieved 2010-22-12
"TV.com"  Retrieved 2014-26-2
"The Crimson White Online"  Retrieved 2014-31-3
The University of Alabama's Graduate News" 
http://www.imdb.com/name/nm2806986/?ref_=fn_al_nm_1

American male television actors
American male film actors
Living people
1986 births